The 2019 GFF Elite League is the 18th season of the GFF Elite League, the top-tier football in Guyana. The season started on 15 March 2019. Many games took place at the 2,000-capacity Georgetown Football Stadium.

League table

Top scorers

References

GFF Elite League seasons
Guyana
1